Cartagena is a 2009 French drama film directed by Alain Monne and starring Sophie Marceau, Christopher Lambert, and Margarita Rosa de Francisco. Based on the novel L'Homme de chevet by Eric Holder, with a screenplay by Alain Monne and Nathalie Vailloud, the film is about a beautiful, free-spirited woman who becomes bedridden following a terrible accident. Against her better judgement, she hires a drunk middle-aged former boxer to cook and care for her. Although unqualified for the position, he is desperate to work, and slowly he wins the trust of the woman, who teaches him how to read by introducing him to the works of Charles Bukowski. Through his help, she is forced to consider the potential happiness that awaits her in the outside world.

Cartagena was filmed on location in Cartagena, Bolívar, Colombia.
The actor Christopher Lambert was six months in Cartagena training with coach Anibal Gonzalez during his preparation for the role.

Cast
 Sophie Marceau as Muriel
 Christopher Lambert as Léo
 Margarita Rosa de Francisco as Lucia
 Rodolfo De Souza as Valdes
 Linett Hernandez Valdes as Lina
 Salvatore Basile as Le kinésithérapeute
 Elizabeth del Carmen Bonilla Isaza as Infirmière remplaçante
 Yamile Cardenas Moreno as Fille blonde coup de poing
 Hancel Gonzalez Forero as L'enfant rêve
 Anibal Gonzalez Parra as Ami Léo
 Diogenes Guerra Miranda as Ecrivain public
 Julian Iragorri as Homme bagarre
 Juliana Morales Uribe as Fille blonde
 Nelson Pallares Narvaez as L'enfant crocodiles
 Alberto Thiele Cenzato as Homme bagarre
 Angelica Vargas as Fille blonde
 Eparkio Vega as Vendeur de livres

References

External links
 
 
 

2009 films
French drama films
Films set in Colombia
2000s French films